Kathleen Joan "Kate" Costain (formerly Beecroft) is a Manx politician who is a former Leader of the Liberal Vannin Party and was a Member of the House of Keys for Douglas South from 2011 to 2020. She changed her surname from Beecroft to Costain in 2019.

Career

Costain was born on the Isle of Man and worked as an accountant before entering politics.

She stood unsuccessfully for the Liberal Vannin Party in Middle in the 2006 Manx general election but later became a Braddan Commissioner from 2007 to 2011. Beecroft served as Chairman of the Liberal Vannin Party from 2008 to 2009. She stood unsuccessfully again in Douglas East in a by-election in 2010, coming second and only seven votes behind Chris Robertshaw who won.

In the 2011 Manx general election Beecroft was elected for the Liberal Vannin Party in Douglas South, becoming one of three Liberal Vannin MHKs.

In February 2014, Peter Karran, the Leader of the Liberal Vannin Party, renounced his leadership in favour of Beecroft. Karran said that it "was time for a change." She once revealed aspirations to bring more women into the House of Keys and to field a Liberal Vannin candidate in every constituency in the 2016 Manx general election. At the 2016 election Liberal Vannin initially fielded only 4 candidates in the 12 constituencies, with one of those resigning from the party on the day of the election.

Beecroft was Minister for Health and Social Care from 2016 until 2018. She was asked by the Chief Minister to resign as minister in January 2018 in controversial circumstances after two political members had resigned from her Department in 2017 and one LibVan MHK had resigned from the party.

She resigned as an MHK in July 2020.

Electoral performance
House of Keys elections

References

Members of the House of Keys 2011–2016
Members of the House of Keys 2016–2021
Living people
Liberal Vannin Party politicians
Year of birth missing (living people)